Youn Chul-ho (born 1 April 1955) is a Presbyterian theologian of South Korea. After teaching systematic theology and hermeneutics for 30 years at Presbyterian University and Theological Seminary, he has been an emeritus professor since June 2020. He has written books and articles of systematic theology. and has received several awards for his contribution to the development of theology of Korea.

Education and influence
He entered Presbyterian University and Theological Seminary in 1980 and finished his M.Div. He received a Th.M. from Princeton Theological Seminary, and Ph.D. with the thesis "God's Relation to the World and Human Existence in the Theologies of Paul Tillich and John B. Cobb, Jr" (1990). He served as chairman of the Korean Systematic Theology Society, and established the Future Theology Institute in 2019, and is its director. His concern and study has been on the systematic theology and the dialogue between theology and science. He has contributed several articles to international journals  and has published more than ten academic books. He insisted that Korean churches could transform the world through the serving and sacrifice of the church.

Publications

Books

Translations

International Professional Journal articles

Awards
 Excellent academic book by the Ministry of Culture, Sports and Tourism Award 2008
 The 31st Korean Christian Publishing Culture Award, Theology Division Grand Prize Award 2015
 The 23rd Korean Christian Publishing Culture Grand Prize in the Theology category Award 2006
 The 30th Korean Christian Publishing Culture Grand Prize Award, Theology Division 2013
 Korea Academy of Sciences Excellent Academic Books Award 2014

See also
 John B. Cobb, Jr
 Paul Tillich

References

External links
 Future Theology Institute Homepage

1955 births
Living people
Northwestern University alumni
Princeton Theological Seminary alumni
Systematic theologians
South Korean Presbyterians
South Korean religious leaders
South Korean theologians